Hillsdale Brick Store is a historic general store building in Hillsdale, Guilford County, North Carolina. It dates to the mid 19th century and is a two-story, two-bay-by-three-bay brick building with Greek-Revival-style design elements. It has a low hipped roof. Also on the property are the contributing remnants of a log icehouse and blacksmith shop.

It was listed on the National Register of Historic Places in 1982.

References

Commercial buildings on the National Register of Historic Places in North Carolina
Greek Revival architecture in North Carolina
Buildings and structures in Guilford County, North Carolina
National Register of Historic Places in Guilford County, North Carolina